The National Schools Symphony Orchestra – known for short as the NSSO – is a youth orchestra composed of secondary school students living in and around the United Kingdom.

It was founded in 1995 and has several distinguished patrons including Patrick Doyle and Sir John Eliot Gardiner.

See also 
 List of youth orchestras

References

External links
 https://www.bbc.co.uk/news/uk-england-oxfordshire-16317126

British symphony orchestras
British youth orchestras
1995 establishments in the United Kingdom
Arts organizations established in 1995
Musical groups established in 1995
Schools in the United Kingdom